The 1994–95 NBA season was the Hawks' 46th season in the National Basketball Association, and 27th season in Atlanta. This was the team's first season since 1981–82 without All-Star forward Dominique Wilkins, as he signed as a free agent with the Boston Celtics in the off-season. During the off-season, the Hawks acquired Ken Norman from the Milwaukee Bucks, and Tyrone Corbin from the Utah Jazz. Early into the season, they traded Kevin Willis to the Miami Heat in exchange for Steve Smith and Grant Long after the first two games. The Hawks struggled losing their first four games, held a 12–19 record as of January 4, and later held a 22–26 record at the All-Star break. However, head coach Lenny Wilkens made history by becoming the NBA's all-time winningest coach, surpassing Red Auerbach on January 6, 1995, with 939 wins in a 112–90 home win over the Washington Bullets. The Hawks won seven of their final ten games, finishing fifth in the Central Division with a mediocre 42–40 record.

Mookie Blaylock led the team with 17.2 points, 7.7 assists, 2.5 steals per game and 199 three-point field goals, which was tied in second in the league, and was named to the NBA All-Defensive First Team. In addition, Smith finished second on the team in scoring averaging 16.2 points per game, while Stacey Augmon provided the team with 13.9 points and 1.3 steals per game. Norman contributed 12.7 points and 4.9 rebounds per game, while Long provided with 11.7 points, 7.5 rebounds and 1.4 steals per game, and Andrew Lang averaged 9.7 points, 5.6 rebounds and 1.8 blocks per game. Sixth man Craig Ehlo contributed 9.7 points per game off the bench, but only played just 49 games due to a knee injury.

However, in the playoffs, the Hawks would be eliminated by the Indiana Pacers for the second consecutive season, as they were swept in three straight games in the Eastern Conference First Round. Following the season, Corbin was traded to the Sacramento Kings, and Jon Koncak signed as a free agent with the Orlando Magic.

For the season, the Hawks added new black alternate road uniforms, which only lasted for just one season.

Draft picks

Roster

Roster Notes
Center Blair Rasmussen missed the entire season due to a back injury.

Regular season

Season standings

Record vs. opponents

Game log

|- align="center" bgcolor="#ffcccc"
| 27
| December 27, 19948:30p.m. EST
| @ Houston
| L 93–105
| Norman (28)
| Norman (11)
| Ehlo (6)
| The Summit16,394
| 11–16

|- align="center"
|colspan="9" bgcolor="#bbcaff"|All-Star Break
|- style="background:#cfc;"
|- bgcolor="#bbffbb"

|- align="center" bgcolor="#ffcccc"
| 62
| March 13, 19957:30p.m. EST
| Houston
| L 86–97
| Blaylock (25)
| Norman (11)
| Smith (7)
| The Omni11,746
| 31–31

Playoffs

|- align="center" bgcolor="#ffcccc"
| 1
| April 27
| @ Indiana
| L 82–90
| Grant Long (18)
| Grant Long (11)
| Mookie Blaylock (9)
| Market Square Arena16,445
| 0–1
|- align="center" bgcolor="#ffcccc"
| 2
| April 29
| @ Indiana
| L 97–105
| Steve Smith (27)
| Grant Long (13)
| Smith, Blaylock (3)
| Market Square Arena16,692
| 0–2
|- align="center" bgcolor="#ffcccc"
| 3
| May 2
| Indiana
| L 89–105
| Mookie Blaylock (20)
| Grant Long (10)
| Mookie Blaylock (5)
| The Omni12,106
| 0–3
|-

Player statistics

Season

Playoffs

Awards and records

Awards
Mookie Blaylock, NBA All-Defensive First Team

Trades
November 7, 1994
Traded Kevin Willis, and a 1996 first round draft pick to the Miami Heat for Grant Long, Steve Smith, and a 1996 second round draft pick.

Player Transactions Citation:

See also
1994–95 NBA season

References

Atlanta Hawks seasons
Atlanta Haw
Atlanta Haw
Atlanta Hawks